In enzymology, a glyoxylate dehydrogenase (acylating) is an enzyme that catalyzes the chemical reaction

glyoxylate + CoA + NADP+  oxalyl-CoA + NADPH + H+

The 3 substrates of this enzyme are glyoxylate, CoA, and NADP+, whereas its 3 products are oxalyl-CoA, NADPH, and H+.

This enzyme belongs to the family of oxidoreductases, specifically those acting on the aldehyde or oxo group of donor with NAD+ or NADP+ as acceptor.  The systematic name of this enzyme class is glyoxylate:NADP+ oxidoreductase (CoA-oxalylating). This enzyme participates in glyoxylate and dicarboxylate metabolism.

References

 

EC 1.2.1
NADPH-dependent enzymes
Enzymes of unknown structure